Odell Barnes Jr. (March 22, 1968, – March 1, 2000) was a Texas man convicted of the 1989 murder of Helen Bass. During the later stages of Barnes' legal appeals, human rights groups and anti-death penalty advocates raised questions about Barnes' murder conviction, leading to international media attention and diplomatic protests from the government of France. Barnes was executed on March 1, 2000.

Murder and conviction 

The murder occurred on November 29, 1989, in Wichita Falls, Texas. Bass, 42, was surprised by Barnes, who had broken into her home while at work, then robbed, beaten, stabbed, and killed by a headshot. She may have also been raped.

Barnes's conviction was based on forensic evidence and witness testimony placing him at the crime scene. His fingerprints were on a bedside lamp that was used to bludgeon Bass, traces of his semen were present at the scene, and two patches of blood on his clothing were confirmed by DNA analysis to have been hers. Prosecution witnesses described seeing Barnes trespassing in Bass's yard about one hour before she returned from work. When arrested, he had a .32 caliber pistol belonging to Bass.

Barnes had a prior record for two robberies. He had been unable to afford his lawyers, and the Wichita County Public Defender's office was not equipped to handle his case, so two local attorneys were appointed for him. Their budget and preparation were minimal, no defense investigation was conducted, and no forensic tests were ordered by the defense. Barnes was convicted by the jury after three hours of deliberation and sentenced to death shortly after.

Appeals process
During Barnes' appeals process, two new attorneys were appointed to his case by a Federal court. European anti-death penalty activists contributed some $16,000 to his defense fund, and the new lawyers paid for forensic tests out of their pocket. The new defense team uncovered deficiencies in the forensic evidence, serious errors and oversights by the original defense team, and problems with the credibility of prosecution witnesses.

Barnes claimed at trial that he had never had sexual contact, consensual or forced, with Bass. DNA testing some years after the trial showed that the semen on her corpse was his. Barnes then claimed that he and Bass had an existing sexual relationship before the crime. Still, on the advice of his original defense team, he did not tell the jury.
At trial, the jury heard that a brand new lamp was found with Barnes' fingerprints. The new defense investigation found that the lamp had not been new and that Barnes had visited Bass' house after she had bought it.
The bloodstains found on Barnes' clothing, confirmed by DNA as Bass's blood, were very small. This was inconsistent with the extremely violent nature of the killing, and the amount of blood found at the scene. Tests revealed that the bloodstains contained an extremely high level of citric acid, which is used as a preservative in crime labs.
The prosecution witness who identified Barnes trespassing at Bass's residence had given inconsistent testimony on different occasions. He described seeing Barnes some 45 minutes after Bass had already returned home.

International attention
Barnes was executed on March 2, 2000. For his last meal, he requested "Justice, Equality, World Peace." His final statement was:

See also
 Capital punishment in Texas
 Capital punishment in the United States
 List of people executed in Texas, 2000–2009
 List of people executed in the United States in 2000

References

General references
 Justice Denied
 Houston Press
 Last Statement. Texas Department of Criminal Justice. Retrieved on 2007-11-20.
 . Texas Department of Criminal Justice (2003-09-12). Archived from the original on 2003-12-02. Retrieved on 2007-11-20.
 Odell Barnes, Jr.. The Clark County Prosecuting Attorney. Retrieved on 2007-11-20.

1968 births
2000 deaths
1989 murders in the United States
American people convicted of murder
People executed for murder
Executed people from Texas
21st-century executions by Texas
People executed by Texas by lethal injection
People convicted of murder by Texas
Executed African-American people
People from Wichita County, Texas
21st-century executions of American people
20th-century African-American people